Prudence Punderson Rossiter (July 28, 1758 – September 16, 1784) was an American artist known for her needlework pictures.

Birth and family
Originally from Preston, Connecticut, Rossiter was the first of eight children of Ebenezer Punderson and Prudence Geer Punderson; her father was a Loyalist during the American Revolutionary War, and as a result the family's goods were confiscated in 1778. The Pundersons fled to Long Island, where they lived in reduced circumstances for the duration of the war.

Work and illness
Prudence turned to domestic work to earn money. In 1780 she overcame a severe illness that threatened her artistic ability; a letter to her sister from this time survives, speaking of a "gathering" on her breast that required lancing.

Marriage and death
On October 20, 1783, she married Timothy Wells Rossiter; their daughter Sophia was born on July 18, 1784, and Prudence died on September 16 of the same year. She was interred in the Maple Cemetery in Berlin, Connecticut.

Art
Rossiter produced a number of needlework pictures, including twelve depictions of the twelve apostles inspired by print sources. She is best known, however, for the self-portrait The First, Second, and Last Scene of Morality, completed around 1775. This work portrays a young woman, the artist herself, seated at a table in a finely-furnished parlor. To one side is a baby in a cradle, being cared for by a black servant. To the other is a coffin, marked "PP", sitting on a table.

The piece is owned by the Connecticut Historical Society. The same organization owns her other needlework pieces as well as her letters, poetry, drawings, and diary. They provide a rare glimpse into the life of a young woman of the period. Rossiter's embroidery is the most-reproduced piece in the Society's collection.

Elements of Rossiter's art have been incorporated into the work of artist Kiki Smith. Her needlework has been discussed by Laurel Thatcher Ulrich.

References

1758 births
1784 deaths
Needlework
American textile artists
18th-century American women artists
18th-century American artists
People from Preston, Connecticut
Artists from Connecticut
18th-century women textile artists
18th-century textile artists